John Ball Zoological Garden is an urban park located on the west side of the city of Grand Rapids, Michigan, United States. The John Ball Zoo is situated on the ravines and bluffs along the west edge of the park.

The zoo houses more than 2,400 individual animals representing over 220 different species and is a significant regional attraction. With the Zoo School and Wildlife Conservation Fund, the zoo gives something back to the community and world as a whole.

The zoo is an accredited member of the Association of Zoos and Aquariums (AZA), and was the first zoo in Michigan to receive accreditation.

History

Early history

The original  of the park was donated to the city by noted pioneer and explorer John Ball upon his death in 1884.  Shortly after, another  would be added and this marked the beginning of additional amenities, including ponds, a theater, a band shell, playgrounds, ball fields, trails, and the zoo.  City commission records provide the first mention of animals at the park in 1891, when there was a debate about whether city money should be used to purchase more animals to add to the existing wounded and orphaned animals at the park.

During the Great Depression, the zoo fell on hard times. Most of the collection was given away to other zoos. The buffalo and deer were butchered to help feed the poor.  Only a few aging animals remained.

Rebirth of the zoo
During 1949, Katherine Whinery approached the mayor of Grand Rapids about resurrecting the zoo by forming a zoo society.  A deal was formed that if a zoo society could be formed, the city would hire a zoo director to run the zoo. Fred Meyer was hired as the first director of the zoo.  Construction of the Monkey Island Exhibit, the first major exhibit ever built, was started in 1949 with an opening date of June 1, 1950.  During the 50-60s, John Ball Zoo was built in the hills of the park.

Recent history

The John Ball Park and Zoo were operated by the City of Grand Rapids until 1989, when the park, known as a regional asset because of the zoo, was sold to Kent County. 

During the 1990s, the zoo expanded with the building of Living Shores Aquarium, which is one of two aquariums in the state of Michigan, and a new cafe eating area outside of it.  Also done at the same time was a new bald eagle aviary.  The Mokomboso Valley Chimpanzee Exhibit opened in 2001.

From 2000 to 2003, controversy arose over idea of moving the zoo further in to the flatlands of the park for an elephant exhibit.  It pitted the zoo and zoo society against the neighbors of the park.  The neighbors tried to get the city of Grand Rapids to designate the whole zoo and park as an historical site as one way to stop the further development of the zoo.  In order to stop the arguing, Fred Meijer offered to donate land and money if the zoo would move.

In 2004, a ballot was put forward to voters in Kent County to relocate the John Ball Zoological Gardens; the referendum was defeated, and the zoo will remain at its current location for the foreseeable future.

In 2005, a new 75-100 million dollar master plan for the zoo was made involving all  of the zoo and park.  Besides the existing camels, African veld, chimps, petting zoo, and animal hospital exhibits, it reworks the whole zoo. The new plan for the zoo features a system of streams named "Grand Rivers of the World" that would connect the zoo to the park surrounding the zoo.

On April 27, 2007, the zoo broke ground on the first phase of the new master plan, starting construction of a 4.1 million dollar   "BISSELL Lions of Lake Manyara" exhibit.  The zoo has not had a lion since "Gilda", their last lion, died of old age in 2005. The exhibit was built for six lions, but only three were placed in the exhibit.

On June 21, 2008, the new green lion exhibit was open to the public.

Kent County including in the 2008-2009 Capital Improvement Allocation half the cost of renovation of the Monkey Island Exhibit.  The other half of renovation is supposed to come from the zoo society. As expected the spider monkeys roamed the new island in May 2009.  The waist high concrete wall that surround the exhibit will be removed.  The cement floor and rocks of the exhibit and moat will be removed and replaced with grass and more natural looking rocks.

In 2014 the zoo formed a non profit to take ownership of the zoo independent of Kent county to help facilitate further growth for the institution. 

On July 8, 2016, the stingray lagoon exhibit was closed after all 18 cownose stingrays and 3 spotted bamboo sharks died due to a mechanical malfunction.  A heavy rainstorm, which shorted a pump circuit, was blamed for the deaths.  The backup system intended to alert zoo officials of a pump failure also failed.

Inclined railway
In August 2012, an inclined railway was opened at the zoo. A train of three cars linked together provides a four-minute ride to the upper areas of the park. The zoo calls it a funicular, but technically it is in the category of inclined elevator since there are not two vehicles (or trains in this case) that counterbalance each other. In either case the configuration as a three-car train rather than one car makes it an unusual example.

Animal collection

Most animals at John Ball Zoo were born in another zoo. Few of the animals are taken from the wild. Almost all the wild animals are at the zoo because they sustained injuries and can no longer live in their natural habitat.

In 2004, the zoo added a Komodo dragon named Precious.
During 2005, the zoo created an Australian walk-through exhibit that featured wallabies and budgies.  The wallabies, if they want to, can come out in the walk way to be petted.

On May 9, 2007, the river otters had a baby boy.  It first went out in the exhibit mid-July.

In early September, the female black-footed cat had two kittens.

The ring-tailed lemur exhibit was started in March 2009 and came out in May.

In 2010, the zoo brought in a troop of Guinea baboons, the largest alligator outside of Florida, moved their flamingos to another pond, and altered the old tiger exhibit to hold a rock hyrax and a group of colobus monkeys.

In 2021, John Ball Zoo announced that a new habitat at the entrance of the zoo was in the process of being built for pygmy hippos, the exhibit will also be home to the sitatunga and white stork. The exhibit is planned to open in 2023. And, in 2022, John Ball Zoo will host two male koalas from the San Diego Zoo Global Education and Conservation Project. After they arrived, their exhibit opened in May 11 2022.

Mammals
African lion
Amur tiger
Black-footed cat
Black-headed spider monkey
Black howler monkey
Cape porcupine
Canada lynx
Capybara
Chimpanzee
Cotton-top tamarin
Cougar
Dromedary camel
Eastern bongo
Geoffroy's spider monkey
Giant anteater
Goeldi's monkey
Grizzly bear
Meerkat
North American porcupine
North American river otter
Pygmy hippopotamus (coming soon)
Red-necked wallaby
Red panda
Ring-tailed lemur
Rock hyrax
Sitatunga (coming soon)
Six-banded armadillo
Snow leopard
Warthog
White-faced saki monkey
White-nosed coati

Birds
African grey parrot
Bald eagle
Barn owl
Black swan
Budgerigar
Chilean flamingo
Crested screamer
Egyptian goose
Golden eagle
Great horned owl
Kelp gull
Magellanic penguin
Pied crow
Snowy owl
Southern ground hornbill
Toco toucan
Von der Decken's hornbill
White stork (coming soon)

Reptiles
Cuvier's dwarf caiman
Grand Cayman blue iguana
Green anaconda
Komodo dragon
Madagascar giant day gecko
Reticulated python

Amphibians
Panamanian golden frog
Red-eyed tree frog

Fish
Brook trout
Lake sturgeon
Leopard shark
Nurse shark
Rainbow trout
Wolf eel

Education and conservation

Education 
John Ball Zoo School is a sixth grade only Magnet School for the Grand Rapids Public Schools.  Each year, sixty students are selected for the school. The school teaches the normal Grand Rapids Public Schools curriculum but with a specialization using the zoo as a lab. The John Ball Zoo school has extra curricular studies and admission is based mostly on students' MEAP scores. The students are required to complete large projects, including studying current events and environmental issues as part of the specialized curriculum.  Learning is done mostly by hands-on experiences; for instance, students are able to go to the zoo frequently and have extended yet limited access to go inside certain animal enclosures.

Wildlife Conservation Fund
In 1985, a conservation fund was started by John Boyles.  The fund pays special attention to native Michigan animals, but also has funded programs in support of endangered amphibians and reptiles.  The Wildlife Conservation Fund has funded projects that helped conserve wildlife and habitats in 30 countries.

See also 
 List of funicular railways

References

External links

 
 Kent County John Ball Zoo website
 John Ball Zoo School website

Geography of Grand Rapids, Michigan
Culture of Grand Rapids, Michigan
Zoos in Michigan
Theatres in Michigan
Urban public parks
Parks in Grand Rapids, Michigan
Zoos established in 1891